Vaughanites superstes is a species of marine gastropod mollusk in the family Pyramimitridae.

Description
The length of the shell attains 15.7 mm.

Distribution
This marine species occurs off the Philippines.

References

 Kantor Y., Lozouet P., Puillandre N. & Bouchet P. (2014) Lost and found: The Eocene family Pyramimitridae (Neogastropoda) discovered in the Recent fauna of the Indo-Pacific. Zootaxa 3754(3): 239–276

superstes
Gastropods described in 2004